Daniel Mateiko (born 4 August 1998) is a Kenyan long-distance runner and member of the NN Running Team. He has raced mainly between 5000m and half marathon and holds a 58:26 half marathon personal best which makes him the 9th fastest of all time over that distance.

Career

2019-2020
Daniel Mateiko began competing on the track primarily at 5000m. On 21 August 2019 he finished 5th at the Kenyan Championships in Nairobi. 
2020 saw Mateiko win the Eldama Ravine Half Marathon in Eldama Ravine, Kenya.

2021
Daniel Mateiko began 2021 competing on the track in 10000m. On 8 June as an invited athlete at the Ethiopian Trials in Hengelo, he raced internationally for the first time, and placed 6th in a personal best of 27:03:94. Mateiko then went to the Kenyan Olympic Trials, and placed 5th in a race won by his NN Running Team training partner Geoffrey Kamworor. Mateiko then moved to the roads and contested two half marathons. First, he placed 3rd at the Copenhagen Half Marathon in 59:25. Then over a month later on 24 October, Mateiko placed 3rd at the Valencia Half Marathon in a personal best and top-10 all-time performer time of 58:26.

2022
Daniel Mateiko started his 2022 racing campaign on the roads and at the Ras al Khaimah Half Marathon on 19 February he placed 6th in 58:45. 
 Mateiko then raced at the Istanbul Half Marathon on 27 March where he finished 2nd in 1:00:05. His compatriot Rodgers Kwemoi won the race. Mateiko then competed on the track and in his season opener at 5000m at the Kip Keino Classic in Nairobi he again was runner-up clocking a new PB of 13:13.45 behind race winner Jacob Krop.

Personal bests
Outdoor

References

External links
{{Daniel Mataiko}} on World Athletics

1998 births
Living people
Kenyan runners
Kenyan male long-distance runners
Kenyan long-distance runners